The Council of the Islamic Revolution was a group formed by Ayatollah Ruhollah Khomeini to manage the Iranian Revolution on 10 January 1979, shortly before he returned to Iran. "Over the next few months there issued from the council hundreds of rulings and laws, dealing with everything from bank nationalization to nurses' salaries." Its existence was kept a secret during the early, less secure time of the revolution, and its members and the exact nature of what the council did remained undisclosed to the public until early 1980. Some of the council's members like Motahhari, Taleqani, Bahonar, Beheshti, Qarani died during Iran–Iraq War or were assassinated by the MKO during the consolidation of the Iranian Revolution. Most of those who remained were put aside by the regime.

Overview

The Council was composed of seven religious figures associated with Khomeini, seven secular opposition figures, and two representatives of the security forces. According to Akbar Hashemi Rafsanjani, Khomeini chose Beheshti, Motahhari, Rafsanjani, Bahonar, Mir-Hossein Mousavi and Musavi Ardabili as members. These invited others to serve: Bazargan, Taleqani, Khamenei, Banisadr, Mahdavi Kani, Sahabi, Katirayee, Javadi, Qarani and Masoodi, Moinfar, Minachi (until 1979) and Ghotbzadeh.

The council put Bazargan forward as the Prime Minister of the Interim Government of Iran, which Khomeini accepted.

It has been described as "a parallel government" that passed laws and competed with the official Interim Government whose leading members had come from the council.

The council served as the undisputed government of Iran from the resignation of Bazargan and the rest of the Interim Government until the formation of first parliament (6 November 1979 - 12 August 1980).

Among the actions the council took was the April 1979 creation of revolutionary tribunals to try and execute enemies of the revolution; nationalization of companies; the delivery of an ultimatum in April 1980 to leftists groups to leave Iranian universities. Following this, a "large number" of leftist were "killed or wounded".

Members of the council were not in complete agreement as to how they wanted Iran to be governed. Abolhassan Banisadr, Ebrahim Yazdi, and Sadegh Ghotbzadeh, and the Ayatollah Mahmoud Taleghani favoured a democratic government, while Khomeini, Beheshti, and other clerics desired a constitution with a planning council but no elected parliament, as law would be based on Sharia law interpreted by mujtahid. The later vision prevailed after the assassination of Ayatollah Mutahhari and the death of Ayatollah Mahmoud Taleghani on 10 September 1979 greatly strengthened the Islamists' hand.

Members
According to Mehdi Bazargan, members of the council were as follows:

Chairmen

See also

 Interim Government of Iran (1979-80)
 Organizations of the Iranian Revolution
 Regency Council

References

Bibliography
 
 
 

Government of the Islamic Republic of Iran
Organisations of the Iranian Revolution
Revolutionary organizations
Ruhollah Khomeini
Revolutionary institutions of the Islamic Republic of Iran